Ridge Township is a township in Dickinson County, Kansas, United States.  As of the 2000 census, its population was 160.

History
Ridge Township was organized in 1872.

Geography
According to the USGS, it contains one cemetery, Pilgrims Home.

Demographics 
As of the 2020 Census, the total population was 132 people. The population density was 3.64 people per square mile, spread over 31.36 miles. Of those people, the median age was 42 years, with 30.4% of the town's population under the age of 18, 51.5% between the ages of 18 and 64, and 18.1% of the population over the age of 65. There were a total of 61 households, with an average of 2.16 people per household.

The racial makeup of the town was 95.5% White, 0% African American, 0% Native American, 3% mixed race, and 2% Hispanic. The median household income was $43,365. 12.9% of the town’s population lives under the poverty line. 62.7% of the population of the town is identified as currently married.

42.2% of the Ridge Township population has received a high school degree, and 17.5% of the town's population have received college degrees.

5.0% of the town's population were veterans, all of which were male.

Further reading

References

 USGS Geographic Names Information System (GNIS)

External links
 City-Data.com
 Dickinson County maps: Current, Historic, KDOT

Townships in Dickinson County, Kansas
Townships in Kansas